In mathematics, an Erdős cardinal, also called a partition cardinal is a certain kind of large cardinal number introduced by .

In the notation of the partition calculus, the Erdős cardinal  is the smallest cardinal such that

Existence of zero sharp implies that the constructible universe  satisfies "for every countable ordinal , there is an -Erdős cardinal".

However, existence of an -Erdős cardinal implies existence of zero sharp. And this in turn, the zero sharp implies the falsity of axiom of constructibility, of Kurt Gödel.

If κ is -Erdős, then it is -Erdős in every transitive model satisfying " is countable".

See also
 List of large cardinal properties

References

 

Large cardinals
Cardinal